Mummy's Dummies is a 1948 short subject directed by Edward Bernds starring American slapstick comedy team The Three Stooges (Moe Howard, Larry Fine and Shemp Howard). It is the 111th entry in the series released by Columbia Pictures starring the comedians, who released 190 shorts for the studio between 1934 and 1959.

Plot
The Stooges are used chariot salesmen in Ancient Egypt. They make the mistake of swindling Rhadames, the captain of the royal guards (Ralph Dunn) by selling him a used chariot that falls apart and he has them promptly arrested.

The Stooges are forced to appear in the palace before Pharaoh Rootentootin (Vernon Dent), who is suffering from a painful toothache just before he sentences the Stooges to be fed to the crocodile-infested river. Seeing an opportunity to redeem themselves, Moe informs the Pharaoh that Shemp is an expert dentist known as Painless Papyrus. Shemp goes about trying to extract the troublesome tooth, resulting in the nearsighted Stooge squashing the Pharaoh’s nose with a pair of pliers. The tooth, however, is removed and the Pharaoh rewards the Stooges by making them royal chamberlains.

As they assume their new roles, the trio uncover a plot where the Pharaoh’s tax collector Tutamon (Philip Van Zandt) is stealing the tax money. Once again, the Pharaoh is indebted to the Stooges and offers his daughter Fatima's (Dee Green) hand in marriage.

Cast

Credited
 Moe Howard as Moe
 Larry Fine as Larry
 Shemp Howard as Shemp
 Vernon Dent as Pharaoh Rootentooten
 Ralph Dunn as Rhadames
 Phil Van Zandt as Tutamon
 Dee Green as Princess Fatima

Uncredited
 Wanda Perry as Fatima
 Suzanne Ridgeway as slave girl
 Jean Spangler as slave girl
 Virginia Ellsworth as slave girl
 Cy Malis as palace guard/Shemp's stand-in

Production notes
Mummy's Dummies was filmed on August 19–22, 1947. The film takes place during the reign of Pharaoh Rootentootin, played by the rather tall and rotund Vernon Dent, but in the film We Want Our Mummy, Rootintootin is said to be a midget.

Every Three Stooges short produced in the 1940s featuring Shemp Howard as the third Stooge was remade in the 1950s except for Mummy's Dummies.

References

External links 
 

1948 films
1948 comedy films
The Three Stooges films
American black-and-white films
Films set in ancient Egypt
Films directed by Edward Bernds
Columbia Pictures short films
American comedy short films
1940s English-language films
1940s American films